Charles Eli Guggenheim (March 31, 1924 – October 9, 2002) was an American documentary film director, producer, and screenwriter. He was the most honored documentary filmmaker in the academy history, winning four Oscars from twelve nominations.

Early life 
Guggenheim was born in Cincinnati, Ohio, into a prominent German-Jewish family, the son of Ruth Elizabeth ( Stix) and Jack Albert Guggenheim. His father and grandfather had a furniture business. He had dyslexia as a child but the condition went undiagnosed and he was thought to be a "slow learner." He did not learn to read until the age of nine. While studying farming at Colorado A&M in 1943, Guggenheim was drafted into the United States Army assigned to the 106th Division. Due to a severe foot infection, he avoided active duty in the Battle of the Bulge. Upon discharge from the service, he finished his college education at University of Iowa in 1948 and then moved to New York City to pursue a career in broadcasting.

Career 

Guggenheim's first job was working for Lew Cohen at CBS, where he was exposed to the new media of film and storytelling. He was subsequently recruited to St. Louis, Missouri, to serve as director of one of the first public television stations in the country, KETC. Two years later in 1954, Guggenheim founded his film production company, Charles Guggenheim and Associates, and produced his first feature film, The Great St. Louis Bank Robbery (1959).

In 1956, he produced the first political advertisement broadcast on television (for losing candidate Adlai Stevenson). In the early 1960s, Guggenheim formed a partnership with television and documentary film producer Shelby Storck and he and Storck collaborated on several documentaries which were nominated for and/or won Academy Awards. Guggenheim received his first Academy Award for Documentary Short Subject for 1964's Nine from Little Rock, about the desegregation effort in Little Rock, Arkansas in 1957. Storck and Guggenheim also collaborated on a well-received political film for Pennsylvania governor Milton Shapp in 1966. That year, Guggenheim moved his company and his family to Washington, D.C., where he became a media advisor to many Democratic political figures. He worked on four presidential campaigns and hundreds of gubernatorial and senatorial campaigns.

Guggenheim worked on Robert F. Kennedy's presidential campaign; after Sen. Kennedy was assassinated, Guggenheim was asked by the Kennedy family to put together a tribute for the 1968 Chicago Convention. It was completed in less than two months. It was shown at the convention and broadcast simultaneously. The convention hall came to a standstill for twenty minutes. The resulting film, Robert Kennedy Remembered (1968), won the Academy Award for Best Live Action Short Film. 

Although Guggenheim occasionally ventured into feature and political film production, he stayed mostly with documentary films. He quit producing political campaign advertisements in the early 1980s saying, "If you play the piano in a house full of ill repute, it doesn't matter how well you play the piano." He won two more Oscars for short subject documentary film-making, for The Johnstown Flood (1989) and A Time for Justice (1995). He received twelve nominations in total.

His last documentary was produced with his daughter and colleague (since 1986), Grace Guggenheim, the 2003 TV documentary film Berga: Soldiers of Another War, a little-known story about a group of 350 American soldiers captured by the Nazis during the Battle of the Bulge who, because they were Jewish or the Nazis thought they "looked Jewish", were sent to slave labor camp and worked beside civilian political prisoners. 

(Guggenheim, who was Jewish, had himself been a member of the 106th Division, which had the highest casualty rate of the Allied Divisions. But a severe leg infection caused him to be left behind when his unit was shipped overseas.) 

Guggenheim finished the film six weeks before his death in October 2002 from pancreatic cancer. Soldiers and Slaves, a companion book to the film, was published by Roger Cohen, New York Times and Herald Tribune columnists using research materials.

Personal life
Guggenheim married Marion Streett in 1957. They had three children: Davis, Grace, and Jonathan. Davis followed in his father's footsteps as a documentary filmmaker and won an Oscar for best documentary in 2007 for An Inconvenient Truth.

Honors and legacy
Guggenheim is recognized with a star on the St. Louis Walk of Fame.

Archives
The moving image collection of Charles Guggenheim is held at the Academy Film Archive. The Charles Guggenheim papers at the academy's Margaret Herrick Library complement the film material at the Academy Film Archive. Guggenheim's film Children Without was preserved by the Academy Film Archive in 2016.

Filmography
 A City Decides, 1956, nominated for the Academy Award for Best Documentary (Short Subject)
 The Great St. Louis Bank Robbery, 1959 (fictional drama)
 Nine from Little Rock, 1964, winner of the 1965 Academy Award for Best Documentary (Short Subject)
 Children Without, 1964, nominated for the Academy Award for Best Documentary (Short Subject)
 Monument to the Dream, 1967, nominated for the Academy Award for Best Documentary (Short Subject) (continuously shown at the St. Louis Gateway Arch)
 Robert Kennedy Remembered, 1968, winner of the 1969 Academy Award for Best Live Action Short Film
 The Klan: A Legacy of Hate in America, 1982 (producer only), nominated for the Academy Award for Best Documentary (Short Subject)
 The Making of Liberty, 1986
 The Johnstown Flood, 1989, winner of the Academy Award for Best Documentary (Short Subject)
 A Time for Justice, 1994, winner of the Academy Award for Best Documentary (Short Subject)
 D-Day Remembered, 1994, nominated for the Academy Award for Best Documentary Feature
 The Shadow of Hate, 1995, nominated for Academy Award for Best Documentary (Short Subject)
 A Place in the Land, 1998, nominated for Academy Award for Best Documentary (Short Subject)

See also
 Charles Guggenheim Cinema St. Louis Award

References

Sources

External links

 

1924 births
2002 deaths
United States Army personnel of World War II
American documentary film producers
American film directors
American people of German-Jewish descent
Artists from Cincinnati
Deaths from cancer in Washington, D.C.
Deaths from pancreatic cancer
Film producers from Ohio
Military personnel from Cincinnati
Producers who won the Best Documentary Short Subject Academy Award
Producers who won the Live Action Short Film Academy Award
University of Iowa alumni